Jack DeJohnette (born August 9, 1942) is an American jazz drummer, pianist, and composer.

Known for his extensive work as leader and sideman for musicians including Charles Lloyd, Freddie Hubbard, Keith Jarrett, Bill Evans, John Abercrombie, Alice Coltrane, Sonny Rollins, Miles Davis, Joe Henderson, Michael Brecker, Pat Metheny, Herbie Hancock and John Scofield, DeJohnette was inducted into the Modern Drummer Hall of Fame in 2007. He has won two Grammy Awards and been nominated for five others.

Biography

Early life and musical beginnings
DeJohnette was born in Chicago, Illinois, to Jack DeJohnette (1911–2011) and Eva Jeanette DeJohnette (née Wood, 1918–1984). Although of predominantly African-American heritage, he has stated that he has some Native American ancestry, specifically Seminole and Crow. He began his musical career as a pianist, studying from age four and first playing professionally at the age of 14. He later switched focus to the drums. When Jack switched to drums, he was also taught drumming techniques from a local jazz drummer, Bobby Miller Jr, who lived in the same neighborhood. DeJohnette credits his uncle, Roy Wood, Sr. (1915–1995), a Chicago disc jockey and vice president/co-founder of the National Black Network of Black Broadcasters, as his inspiration to play music.

DeJohnette played R&B, hard bop, and avant-garde music in Chicago. He led his own groups in addition to playing with Richard Abrams, Roscoe Mitchell and other eventual core members of the Association for the Advancement of Creative Musicians (founded in 1965). He also occasionally performed with Sun Ra and his Arkestra, and later in New York as well. In the early 1960s, DeJohnette had the opportunity to sit in for three tunes with John Coltrane and his quintet, an early foray into playing with big-name jazz musicians.

In 1966 DeJohnette moved to New York City, where he became a member of the Charles Lloyd Quartet. A band that recognized the potential influence of rock and roll on jazz, Lloyd's group was where DeJohnette first encountered pianist Keith Jarrett, who would work extensively with him throughout his career. However, DeJohnette left the group in early 1968, citing Lloyd's deteriorating, "flat" playing as his main reason for leaving. While Lloyd's band was where he received international recognition for the first time, it was not the only group DeJohnette played with during his early years in New York, as he also worked with groups including Jackie McLean, Abbey Lincoln, Betty Carter, and Bill Evans. DeJohnette joined Evans' trio in 1968, the same year the group headlined the Montreux Jazz Festival and produced the album Bill Evans at the Montreux Jazz Festival. In November 1968, he worked briefly with Stan Getz and his quartet, which led to his first recordings with Miles Davis.

The Miles Davis years
In 1969, DeJohnette left the Evans trio and replaced Tony Williams in Miles Davis's live band. Davis had seen DeJohnette play many times, one of which was during a stint with Evans at Ronnie Scott's Jazz Club in London in 1968, where he also first heard bassist Dave Holland. Davis recognized DeJohnette's ability to combine the driving grooves associated with rock and roll with improvisational aspects associated with jazz.

DeJohnette was the primary drummer on Bitches Brew. DeJohnette and the other musicians saw the Bitches Brew sessions as unstructured and fragmentary, but also innovative: "As the music was being played, as it was developing, Miles would get new ideas...He’d do a take, and stop, and then get an idea from what had just gone on before, and elaborate on it...The recording of Bitches Brew was a stream of creative musical energy. One thing was flowing into the next, and we were stopping and starting all the time." While he was not the only drummer involved in the project, as Davis had also enlisted Billy Cobham, Don Alias, and Lenny White, DeJohnette was considered the leader of the rhythm section within the group. He played on the live albums that would follow the release of Bitches Brew, taken from concerts at the Fillmore East in New York and Fillmore West in San Francisco. These ventures were undertaken at the behest of Clive Davis, then president of Columbia Records.

DeJohnette continued to work with Davis for the next three years, which led to collaborations with other Davis band members John McLaughlin, Chick Corea, and Holland; he also drew Keith Jarrett into the band. DeJohnette contributed to such Davis albums as Live-Evil (1971), Jack Johnson (1971), and On the Corner (1972), along with sessions later released on the 1981 compilation album Directions. He left the Davis group in -mid-1971, although he returned for several concerts through the rest of that year.

Solo and bandleader in the 1970s and '80s

DeJohnette's first record, The DeJohnette Complex, was released in 1968; on the album, he played melodica as well as drums, preferring often to let his mentor, Roy Haynes, sit behind the set. He also recorded, in the early 1970s, the albums Have You Heard, Sorcery, and Cosmic Chicken. He released these first four albums on either the Milestone or Prestige labels, and then switched to ECM for his next endeavors; ECM gave him a "fertile platform" for his "atmospheric drumming and challenging compositions." He was also featured on First Light, an album by trumpeter Freddie Hubbard, released by CTI in 1971.

The musical freedom he had while recording for ECM offered DeJohnette many dates as a sideman and opportunities to start his own groups. He first formed the group Compost in 1972, but this was a short-lived endeavor, and DeJohnette cited the music as far too experimental to achieve commercial success. During this period, DeJohnette continued his career as a sideman as well, rejoining Stan Getz's quartet from 1973 to October 1974, and also enticing Dave Holland to join Getz's rhythm section. This stint briefly preceded the formation of the Gateway Trio, a group that DeJohnette helped form but did not lead. This group came directly out of DeJohnette's time with Getz, as Holland joined him in this group along with guitarist John Abercrombie, both of whom would become associated with DeJohnette throughout his career. His next group effort was Directions, a group formed in 1976 featuring saxophonist Alex Foster, bassist Mike Richmond, and Abercrombie, showing the links between the members of the Gateway trio. This was another short-lived group, yet it led directly to the formation of DeJohnette's next group, New Directions, which featured Abercrombie again on guitar along with Lester Bowie on trumpet and Eddie Gómez on bass. This group coexisted with another DeJohnette group, Special Edition, which was the first DeJohnette-led group to receive critical acclaim. This group also helped the careers of many lesser-known young horn players, as it had a rotating front line that included David Murray, Arthur Blythe, Chico Freeman, and John Purcell, among others.

During this period, especially with Special Edition, DeJohnette offered "the necessary gravity to keep the horns in a tight orbit" in his compositions while also treating his listeners to "the expanded vocabulary of the avant-garde plus the discipline of traditional jazz compositions." DeJohnette's work with Special Edition has been interrupted regularly by other projects, the most significant of which are his recordings in 1983 and tours from 1985 as a member of Keith Jarrett's trio, which was totally devoted to playing jazz standards. The trio included his long-time compatriot Jarrett and bassist Gary Peacock, and all three have been members of the group for over 25 years.

At the start of the 1980s, DeJohnette played on the album 80/81 with Pat Metheny, Charlie Haden, Dewey Redman and Michael Brecker. In 1981, DeJohnette performed at the Woodstock Jazz Festival, held in celebration of the 10th anniversary of the Creative Music Studio.

1990s to the present

DeJohnette continued to work with Special Edition into the 1990s, but did not limit himself to that. In 1990 he toured in a quartet consisting of himself, Herbie Hancock, Pat Metheny, and his long-time collaborator Holland, and released Parallel Realities with this group the same year. In 1992 he released a major collaborative record, Music for the Fifth World, which was inspired by studies with a Native American elder and brought him together musically with players like Vernon Reid and John Scofield. He had also, during the 1980s, resumed playing piano, which led to his 1994 tour as an unaccompanied pianist. He also began working again with Abercrombie and Holland, reviving the Gateway trio. In 1990, DeJohnette was awarded an Honorary Doctorate of Music from Berklee College of Music.

In 2004, he was nominated for a Grammy award for his work on Keith Jarrett's live album The Out-of-Towners, and continued to work with that group into 2005. In the next few years, DeJohnette would begin and lead three new projects, the first of which was the Latin Project consisting of percussionists Giovanni Hidalgo and Luisito Quintero, reedman Don Byron, pianist Edsel Gomez, and bassist Jerome Harris. The other two new projects were the Jack DeJohnette Quartet, featuring Harris again alongside Danilo Perez and John Patitucci, and the Trio Beyond, a tribute to DeJohnette's friend Tony Williams and his trio Lifetime (consisting of Williams, Larry Young and John McLaughlin), featuring John Scofield and Larry Goldings. DeJohnette also founded his own label, Golden Beams Productions, in 2005. That same year, he released Music in the Key of Om on his new label, an electronic album which he created for relaxing and meditative purposes on which he played synthesizer and resonating bells, which was nominated for a Grammy in the Best New Age Album category.

DeJohnette continued to make albums as a leader and sideman throughout this period as well, one of which was The Elephant Sleeps But Still Remembers, a collaboration that documents the first meeting of DeJohnette and guitarist Bill Frisell in 2001 and led to another tour, with Frisell and Jerome Harris. The next year Trio Beyond released Saudades, a live recording of a concert commemorating Tony Williams in London in 2004. In 2008, DeJohnette toured with Bobby McFerrin, Chick Corea, and the Jarrett trio, and the next year won the Grammy Award for Best New Age Album with Peace Time. In 2010, he founded the Jack DeJohnette Group, featuring Rudresh Mahanthappa on alto saxophone, David Fiuczynski on double-neck guitar, George Colligan on keyboards and piano, and long-time associate Jerome Harris on electric and acoustic bass guitars.

In 2012, DeJohnette released Sound Travels, which included appearances by McFerrin, Quintero, Bruce Hornsby, Esperanza Spalding, Lionel Loueke, and Jason Moran. The same year, he was awarded an NEA Jazz Masters Fellowship for his "significant lifetime contributions [which] have helped to enrich jazz and further the growth of the art form."

Style
DeJohnette's style incorporates elements of jazz, free jazz, world music, and R&B, contributing to him being one of the most highly regarded and in-demand drummers. Initially a traditional grip player, he later switched to matched grip due to a problem with tendinitis.

His drumming style has been called unique; one critic writes that he is not merely a drummer but a "percussionist, colourist and epigrammatic commentator mediating the shifting ensemble densities" and that "his drumming is always part of the music's internal construction." In a 2004 interview, Modern Drummer magazine called DeJohnette's drumming "beyond technique."

DeJohnette calls himself an "abstract thinker" when it comes to soloing, saying that he puts "more weight on the abstract than, 'What were you thinking in bar 33?' I don't like to think that way. I can do it, but I like to be more in the flow." In terms of what he feels when he plays, DeJohnette said that when he plays, he goes "into an altered state, a different headspace. I plug into my higher self, into the cosmic library of ideas." He has remarked that he has to play with a lot of restraint when playing in Keith Jarrett's trio, in order "to play with the subtlety that the music requires."

Discography 

 The DeJohnette Complex (Milestone, 1968 [1969])
 Have You Heard (Milestone, 1970)
 Jackeyboard (Trio, 1973)
 Time & Space (Trio, 1973)
 Sorcery (Prestige, 1974)
 Cosmic Chicken (Prestige, 1975)
 Untitled (ECM, 1976)
 Pictures (ECM, 1976 [1977])
 New Rags (ECM, 1977)
 New Directions (ECM, 1978)
 Special Edition (ECM, 1979 [1980])
 New Directions in Europe (ECM, 1979 [1980])
 Tin Can Alley (ECM, 1980 [1981])
 Inflation Blues (ECM, 1982 [1983])
 Album Album (ECM, 1984)
 The Jack DeJohnette Piano Album (Landmark, 1985)
 Zebra (MCA, 1989)
 In Our Style (DIW, 1986)
 Irresistible Forces (MCA/Impulse!, 1987)
 Audio-Visualscapes (MCA/Impulse!, 1988)
 Parallel Realities (MCA, 1990)
 Earthwalk (Blue Note, 1991)
 Music for the Fifth World (Manhattan, 1992)
 Extra Special Edition (Blue Note, 1994)
 Dancing with Nature Spirits (ECM, 1995)
 Oneness (ECM, 1997)
 The Elephant Sleeps But Still Remembers (Golden Beams, 2001) with Bill Frisell
 Music from the Hearts of the Masters (Golden Beams, 2005)
 Music in the Key of Om (Golden Beams, 2005)
 Hybrids (Golden Beams, 2005), The Ripple Effect
 Saudades (ECM, 2006), Trio Beyond
 Peace Time (Golden Beams, 2006 [2007])
 Music We Are (Golden Beams, 2009)
 Sound Travels (eOne/Golden Beams, 2012)
 Made in Chicago (ECM, 2013 [2015]) with Muhal Richard Abrams, Larry Gray, Roscoe Mitchell, Henry Threadgill
 In Movement  (ECM, 2016)
 Return  (Newvelle, 2016), solo piano (vinyl LP)
 Hudson (Motema, 2017)

As a guest 
 If on a Winter's Night... - Sting (2009) - drums on one song The Burning Babe

Awards
 Fellow of United States Artists (2012)
 NEA Jazz Master (2012)
 Grammy Award for Best Jazz Instrumental Album, Skyline, 64th Annual GRAMMY Awards
 Grammy Award for Best New Age Album, Peace Time, 51st Annual Grammy Awards
 Five additional Grammy Award nominations

Bibliography
 Barnhart, Stephen L. Percussionists: a Biographical Dictionary. Westport, CT: Greenwood Press, 2000.
 Himes, Geoffrey. "Jack DeJohnette and Art Blakey", The Washington Post, June 3, 1983.
 Hovan, C. Andrew. "Live Reviews: Jack DeJohnette Latin Project", All About Jazz, February 19, 2005 . Retrieved April 24, 2012.
 Nicholson, Stuart. Jazz Rock: a History. New York: Schirmer Books, 1998.
 Porter, Lewis.  "Jack DeJohnette". In Barry Kernfield (ed.), The New Grove Dictionary of Jazz, volume 1. New York: Grove, 2002.
 Tingen, Paul. Miles Beyond: the Electric Explorations of Miles Davis, 1967-1991. New York: Billboard Books, 2001.
 "Jack DeJohnette: Biography", Jack DeJohnette official website. Retrieved April 23, 2012.
 "Jack DeJohnette", Modern Drummer, May 12, 2004. Retrieved April 23, 2012.
 "Sound Travels". Jack DeJohnette official website. Retrieved April 24, 2012.

References

External links

 Official web site
 Jack DeJohnette's MySpace page
 At drummerworld.com
 Jack DeJohnette at BehindTheDrums.com – Discography and equipment list
Jack DeJohnette Interview – NAMM Oral History Library (2009)

1942 births
Living people
20th-century African-American musicians
20th-century American drummers
20th-century American male musicians
20th-century American pianists
21st-century African-American musicians
21st-century American male musicians
21st-century American pianists
African-American pianists
American jazz composers
American jazz drummers
American jazz pianists
American male drummers
American male jazz composers
American male pianists
Avant-garde jazz musicians
ECM Records artists
Free jazz drummers
Gateway (band) members
Grammy Award winners
Jazz fusion drummers
Jazz musicians from Illinois
Melodica players
Musicians from Chicago
Trio Beyond members